The D-Boy Diary: Book 2 is the twenty fourth studio album by American rapper E-40. It was released on November 18, 2016, by Heavy on the Grind Entertainment.

Track listing

Charts

References

2016 albums
E-40 albums
Albums produced by Droop-E
Albums produced by Nard & B
Albums produced by Rick Rock
Sequel albums